Cundletown is a town on the Mid North Coast, New South Wales, Australia. Cundletown and the nearby larger town of Taree were both settled in 1831 by William Wynter. Cundletown had a population of 2,054 as of the 2016 census. and is a significant agricultural district. It is 16 km from the Tasman Sea coast, and 317 km north of Sydney.

Cundletown and Taree can be reached by train via the North Coast Railway, and by the Pacific Highway.

Cundletown is within the local government area of Mid-Coast Council, the state electorate of Myall Lakes and the Federal electorate of Lyne.

References

Localities in New South Wales
Mid-Coast Council